Pilumnoides is a genus of crabs in the family Pilumnoididae. The genus was erected by Hippolyte Lucas in 1844. It contains the following species:
Pilumnoides coelhoi Guinot & Macpherson, 1987 – Abrolhos Archipelago
Pilumnoides hassleri A. Milne-Edwards, 1880 – Atlantic coast of South America
Pilumnoides inglei Guinot & Macpherson, 1987 – south coast of England
Pilumnoides monodi Guinot & Macpherson, 1987 – Gabon
Pilumnoides nudifrons (Stimpson, 1871) – Caribbean Sea
Pilumnoides perlatus (Poeppig, 1836) – Pacific coast of South America
Pilumnoides rotundus Garth, 1940 – Pacific coast of the Neotropics
Pilumnoides rubus Guinot & Macpherson, 1987 – south-western Africa

References

Crabs